In Bahrain, the prime minister is the head of government of the country. According to the Constitution of Bahrain, the prime minister is appointed directly by the King, and needs not to be an elected member of the Council of Representatives.

Bahrain has had only two prime ministers since the country's independence, Khalifa bin Salman Al Khalifa, the paternal uncle of the reigning king Hamad bin Isa Al Khalifa, and Salman bin Hamad Al Khalifa, the crown prince. Khalifa bin Salman Al Khalifa died on 11 November 2020.

Prince Salman bin Hamad bin Isa Al Khalifa was the deputy king, crown prince, heir apparent and since March 2013 has been First Deputy Prime Minister. He was also the deputy supreme commander of the Bahrain Defense Force. There are also four deputy prime ministers: Muhammad ibn Mubarak ibn Hamad Al Khalifah, Ali bin Khalifa Al Khalifa, Khalid bin Abdullah Al Khalifa, and Jawad Al Arrayed.

List of officeholders (1970–present)

See also
Politics of Bahrain

References

External Links
 

 
Political history of Bahrain
Government of Bahrain